The CIE 501 Class locomotives were built in 1955 by Walker Brothers of Wigan for use on the narrow gauge lines on the West Clare section of the CIÉ. They were small diesel mechanical locomotives, with a 0-4-0+0-4-0 wheel arrangement. Unusually the locomotives were driven from a seat mounted sideways to the direction of travel giving a clear field of vision both ways by a mere turn of the head.

The locomotives were fitted with vacuum brakes, emergency braking coming from a "deadman's" pedal, one at the driving position and two others, one mounted on each side of the cab. 

History
They were originally numbered C31-C33 in the West Clare steam locomotive series, but were subsequently renumbered into the diesel locomotive series as F501-F503. They were withdrawn in 1961 when the West Clare lines were closed and stored at Inchicore Works for seven years. The Isle of Man Railway made an offer for the locomotives which was rejected by CIÉ, who subsequently made less money by selling them for scrap in 1968.

Model 
The Walker 501 Class has been made as a 00n3 scale 12mm gauge brass kit by Worsley Works Models

References

External links 
 http://www.worsleyworks.co.uk - official website

Iarnród Éireann locomotives
Diesel locomotives of Ireland
5 ft 3 in gauge locomotives
Railway locomotives introduced in 1954
Scrapped locomotives